The Roman Catholic Diocese of Thunder Bay is a Latin suffragan in the ecclesiastical province of the Metropolitan Archdiocese of Toronto, in Ontario, Canada.

Its cathedral episcopal see is St. Patrick's Cathedral, dedicated to St. Patrick, in Thunder Bay, Ontario.

Statistics 
As per 2014 it pastorally served 81,400 Catholics (31.0% of 262,600 total) on 220,000 km² in 43 parishes with 46 priests (37 diocesan, 9 religious), 36 deacons and 16 lay religious (9 brothers, 7 sisters) .

History 
 It was erected 29 April 1952, as the Diocese of Fort William, on territories split off from the Metropolitan Archdiocese of Saint-Boniface and the Diocese of Sault Sainte Marie.
 Renamed on 26 February 1970 as Diocese of Thunder Bay, after its see.

Episcopal ordinaries
(all Roman Rite)

Suffragan Bishops of Fort William 
 Edward Quentin Jennings (born Canada) (1952.05.14 – 1969.09.18), previously Titular Bishop of Sala (1941.03.22 – 1946.02.22) as Auxiliary Bishop of Archdiocese of Vancouver (BC, Canada) (1941.03.22 – 1946.02.22), Bishop of Kamloops (Canada) (1946.02.22 – 1952.05.14); emeritate as Titular Bishop of Assidona (1969.09.18 – resigned 1970.11.23), died 1980.

Suffragan Bishops of Thunder Bay 
 Norman Joseph Gallagher (1970.04.16 – death 1975.12.28); previously Titular Bishop of Adrasus (1963.06.25 – 1970.04.16), first as Auxiliary Bishop of the Military Vicariate of Canada (Canada) (1963.06.25 – 1966), then as Auxiliary Bishop of Archdiocese of Montréal (Quebec, Canada) (1966 – 1970.04.16)
 John Aloysius O′Mara (1976.05.24 – 1994.02.02), next Bishop of Saint Catharines (Canada) (1994.02.02 – retired 2001.11.09)
 Frederick Bernard Henry (1995.03.24 – 1998.01.19); previously Titular Bishop of Carinola (1986.04.18 – 1995.03.24) as Auxiliary Bishop of London (Ontario, Canada) (1986.04.18 – 1995.03.24); later Bishop of Calgary (BC, Canada) (1998.01.19 – retired 2017.01.04)
 Frederick Joseph Colli (2 February 1999 - ... ), previously Titular Bishop of Afufenia (1994.12.19 – 1999.02.02) as Auxiliary Bishop of Ottawa (Ontario, Canada) (1994.12.19 – 1999.02.02).

See also 
 List of Catholic dioceses in Canada

References

Sources and external links 
 Diocese of Thunder Bay site
 GCatholic, with Google map & satellite photo

 
1952 establishments in Ontario